The Chronicle And North Coast Advertiser was a newspaper published in Nambour, Queensland, Australia.

History 
The first issue was published on 31 July 1903 by proprietor and editor, Luke Wilkinson.

The last issue was published in 1983.

Digitisation 
Issues from 1903 to 1922 have been digitised and are available through Trove.

References

External links 
 

Defunct newspapers published in Queensland